is a retired Japanese professional Go player.

Biography
Abe was born in Kyoto City, Kyoto Prefecture, Japan. He became a professional in 1955.

Promotion record

References

External links
 Nihon Ki-in profile 
 GoBase.org profile
 Sensei's Library profile

1934 births
Japanese Go players
Living people
Sportspeople from Kyoto
20th-century Japanese people